The Borki train disaster occurred on October 29, 1888 (N.S.), near Borki station in the former Kharkov Governorate of the Russian Empire (present-day Birky, Chuhuiv Raion, Kharkiv Oblast, Ukraine), 295 kilometers south of Kursk, when the imperial train carrying Tsar Alexander III of Russia and his family from Crimea to Saint Petersburg derailed at high speed. Twenty-one people died at the scene and two later, and many others were injured. According to the official version of events, Alexander held the collapsed roof of the royal car on his shoulders while his family escaped the crash site uninjured. The story of the miraculous escape became part of contemporary lore and government propaganda. The investigation into the crash, led by Anatoly Koni, resulted in the appointment of railway manager and future Prime Minister of the Russian Empire Sergei Witte as the Director of State Railways.

The accident

The imperial family was en route from Crimea to Saint Petersburg. Contrary to railway rules of the period that limited commercial passenger trains to 42 axles, the imperial train of fifteen carriages had 64 axles. Its weight was within the limits set for freight trains, but the train actually travelled at express speeds. It was hauled by two steam engines, a combination that caused dangerous vibrations that, according to Sergei Witte, directly caused the derailment. Technical flaws of the royal train were known in advance, yet it had operated for nearly a decade without incidents.

Twenty-one people were killed instantly. According to official reports, corroborated by Sergei Witte's memoirs, at the moment of the crash the royal family was in the dining car. Its roof collapsed in the crash, and Alexander held the remains of the roof on his shoulders as the children fled outdoors. 
None of the royal family initially appeared to be hurt, but the onset of Alexander's kidney failure was later linked to the blunt trauma suffered in Borki.

Publicity
The survival of the Romanovs was celebrated. When Alexander returned to Saint Petersburg and went to the Kazan Cathedral, university students wanted to unharness his carriage and pull it by hand.

In the view of the established religion, the salvation of the imperial family was hailed as divine intervention by the Sovereign. Pamphlets by clergymen linked the miraculous escape to the miracles of 17th-century icons at the end of the great plague of 1654–1655; the laity believed that prayers in front of these icons enabled the survival of the Tsar. A special icon of the God's Grace on the 17th of October, made for the occasion, widely circulated in photographic copies. Moscow, the old shrine of Orthodoxy, was perceived as the source of the miracle; a contemporary pamphlet declared that the "power that Moscow had professed and that had exalted her revoked these laws [of Nature]".

Investigation

Immediately after the crash Chief Inspector of Railways, Baron Sherval, who had been travelling on the royal train and had broken his leg in the crash, summoned railway manager Sergei Witte and director of Kharkiv Polytechnical Institute Victor Kirpichev to lead the investigation on site. Anatoly Koni, an influential public lawyer, was dispatched from Saint Petersburg later.

In the preceding years, Witte had been regularly involved in managing imperial train journeys across his railroad and was well known to the tsar. Two months before the crash Alexander, upset about Witte's insistence on reducing train speed limits, had publicly chastised him and his railway, referring to its owners' ethnicity: "Nowhere else has my speed been reduced; your railroad is an impossible one because it is a Jewish road". According to Witte, he had warned the government earlier of the deficiencies in train setup, notably using paired steam engines and faulty saloon cars.

The three investigators disagreed on the direct cause of the crash. Witte insisted that it was caused by speeding, exonerating railroad management; Kirpichev blamed rotten wooden ties, whilst Koni shifted the blame onto the railroad, exonerating state officials. Witte, in particular, maneuvered between blaming state officials and exonerating Minister of Communications Konstantin Posyet. In the end, Alexander preferred to close the case quietly, allowed Sherval and Posyet to retire, and appointed Witte as the Director of Imperial Railways. Despite Witte's efforts, railroad management did not escape public attention. The contractor who built the Kursk-Kharkov line, Samuel Polyakov, who died two months before the crash, was posthumously linked to inferior construction quality of the railroad. The public particularly "credited" him with substandard gravel ballast pads that failed to cushion track vibrations as they were supposed to.

See also 
 List of Russian rail accidents

References

Sources

External links

  Catastrophe of a Tsar's train near Kharkov "Historical pravda" (Ukrainian pravda)

Derailments in Russia
Railway accidents in 1888
1888 in the Russian Empire
History of Kharkiv Oblast
Disasters in the Russian Empire
Derailments in Ukraine
October 1888 events
1888 disasters in the Russian Empire
19th-century disasters in Ukraine